The Clarke County Courthouse in Athens, Georgia is a historic courthouse serving Clarke County which was built in 1914. It is part of the Downtown Athens Historic District.

References

County courthouses in Georgia (U.S. state)
Clarke County, Georgia
Buildings and structures in Athens, Georgia
Government buildings completed in 1914